The 1992 Fusagasugá City Council election was held on Sunday, 8 March 1992.

References 

1992
Regional elections